Walter Scott Williams, known professionally as Scotty ATL, is an American rapper, songwriter, record producer and entrepreneur.

Early life 
ATL attributes his interest in hip-hop to both of his parents, noting that his mother in particular would often play 2Pac around the house.  As he grew older, he took a serious interest in music, along with a friend, King J, who was a rapper.  ATL used the equipment to create a recording studio in his family's basement, and started to record CDs to sell at school.

Upon graduating from Redan High School in Atlanta, Scotty attended Savannah State University to play basketball. He rededicated himself to music, and, as part of the group Monopoly Fleet that he had formed in high school,  released an album titled 2339 Underground Boyz. Scotty and Monopoly Fleet signed a record deal following the release of 2339 Underground Boyz, and, while still in college, began traveling from Atlanta to Savannah to focus on recording a new album, though the deal ultimately fell through. With the failed deal behind him, Scotty moved back to Atlanta and "got involved in the whole little street life," focusing less on music.

Career 
Scotty ATL formed his own label imprint Cool Club. He released projects such as In The Meantime, The Jiffy Cornbread Experience, F.A.I.T.H (Forever Atlanta In The Heart), In The Meantime 2 and SPAGHETTI Junction. In 2014, he joined forces with Grammy-nominated artist B.o.B's No Genre imprint and embarked on a nationwide tour billed the Cool Club Tour. The following year he was featured on the remix to Curren$y's "Cloud IX" and followed the appearance up with The Cooligan, a 16-track project hosted by DJ Scream and DJ Mike Mars. The mixtape featured collaborations with Curren$y, CyHi The Prynce, 8Ball, Devin The Dude and B.O.B, with production credits to KE On The Track, DJ Burn One and Drumma Boy.

Eventually he caught the attention of No Genre label president B.o.B and he was invited to perform with him on stage at the 20th Anniversary of Hot 107.9's Birthday Bash in 2015. He also performed on the Next To Blow stage on the same day. He then hit the road for the No Genre Tour in 2015 and lent his talents to open for Big K.R.I.T. in 29 cities. Scotty ATL also appeared on the now defunct BET program 106 & Park, where he did a backroom freestyle.

Scotty ATL created the No Handouts Tour with a mix of established and emerging rappers in a number of key cities throughout the southeastern region. He is the proprietor of a grill company that has supplied custom gold mouthpieces to rap counterparts such as Trinidad James, Rich Homie Quan, K Camp, Killer Mike and Trouble. Additionally, he owns rental property throughout Georgia and volunteers his time to motivate inner city youth to stay on the correct path, His 2019 project, was officially released on May 11, featuring the likes of the late Bankroll Fresh, King Shy, Euro, Wurld, Curtis Snow, and more.

Touring 
In January 2013, Scotty ATL embarked on his first headline tour, the Cool Club Tour, with opening act League of Extraordinary Gz. Also appearing on select dates of the tour were artists including Starlito, SL Jones, DJ Burn One, Big Sant, and other local acts. In 2015 he went on the Slow Motion Tour with Jarren Benton, the All Eyes On Me Tour with Iamsu, & the Kritically Acclaimed Tour with Big K.R.I.T. and BJ the Chicago Kid.

Discography

EPs 
OTR2SJ (2014)

Mixtapes 
Summer Dreams (2011)
In the Meantime (2012)
The Jiffy Cornbread Experience (2012)
 F.A.I.T.H. (Forever Atlanta In The Heart) (2013)
In The Meantime 2 (2014)
 SPAGHETTI Junction (2014)
"Traffic Jamz" (2015)
The Cooligan (2015)
Live & Direct (with B.o.B) (2016)
Unplugged: Scotty Live from Smiths Olde Bar (2016)
Home Sick (2016)
Who shot Cupid? (with Drumma Boy) (2017)
OTW (2018)
It's Time (2018)
Streams (2019)
Trappin Gold (2021)

References

External links 

African-American male rappers
African-American record producers
American hip hop record producers
Living people
Rappers from Atlanta
Southern hip hop musicians
1985 births
21st-century American rappers
21st-century American male musicians
21st-century African-American musicians
20th-century African-American people